Girolamo d'Andrea (1812–1868) was an Italian Cardinal. He was born at Naples, educated at the Collège of La Flèche, France, and was early appointed Archbishop of Mytilene in partibus infidelium.

Biography
In 1852 he was appointed Cardinal-abbot of Subiaco, and Prefect of the Congregation of the Index, and in 1860 Bishop of Sabina.

He took sides with the Patriotic party in 1859 on the question of the national unity of Italy, and at the same time counseled extensive liberal reforms in Church policy. He was suspended from his diocese and abbacy and threatened with permanent deposition from office. He ultimately submitted, and in 1868 was rehabilitated, without, however, being restored to his diocese and the abbacy of Subiaco.

References

19th-century Italian cardinals
Cardinals created by Pope Pius IX
Cardinal-bishops of Sabina
1812 births
1868 deaths